Balaklava District is an administrative raion (district) of the city of Sevastopol.

The raion was created in 1930 as part of the Crimean ASSR with its administrative center in Balaklava. After World War II in 1957, it became part of Sevastopol city municipality. All populated places of the raion became incorporated with the city of Sevastopol. In 1976, the city of Inkerman was reinstated as a city. Population: 

The raion is subdivided into three municipality (councils): Inkerman city council, Orlyne rural council, and Ternivka rural council. Balaklava District borders with Bakhchysarai Raion and Yalta Municipality.

See also
Baydar Valley

References

Urban districts of Sevastopol